Spiridon Vangheli (born 14 June 1932) is a Moldovan children's writer, poet and translator.

Career 
Vangheli graduated Ion Creangă State Pedagogical University in 1955 and after various jobs in schools, including as math professor, he joined Moldovan Writers' Union and became consulting editor. 

His first publishing debut was in 1962, a book for children "In the land of butterflies". 

His books were translated in 40 languages

Legacy 
His most characteristic work are the series of children books about the adventures of Guguţă - a little boy who received from his father a big traditional lamb skin hat, that became his inseparable attribute. The story goes that Guguţă invites his classmates and the entire village to snuggle under the hat, protecting everyone from the winter cold. As more people join, the hat grows bigger, a metaphor of growing generosity. The books about Guguţă became widely popular and the personage became a national symbol.

Selection of works 
1964, Chisinau - "The Little Boy in the Blue Hut"

1967, Bucuresti - "The Adventures of Guguţă"

1970, Chisinau - "Abecedarul", in collaboration with Grigore Vieru and painter Igor Vieru

1979, Chisinau - "Guguţă - captain of the ship"

1981, Chisinau - "The horse with blue eyes"

2001, Chisinau - "Children in the handcuffs of Siberia"

References 

1932 births
Moldovan writers

Living people
People from Rîșcani District